1803 Zwicky, prov. designation: , is a stony Phocaea asteroid and binary system from the inner regions of the asteroid belt, approximately  in diameter. It was discovered on 6 February 1967, by Swiss astronomer Paul Wild at Zimmerwald Observatory near Bern, Switzerland. It was later named after Swiss astronomer Fritz Zwicky. The discovery of a 2.5-kilometer sized companion was announced on 8 March 2021.

Classification and orbit 

Zwicky is a member of the Phocaea family, an asteroid family with two thousand members, named after their largest member, 25 Phocaea. It orbits the Sun in the inner main-belt at a distance of 1.8–2.9 AU once every 3 years and 7 months (1,316 days; semi-major axis of 2.35 AU). Its orbit has an eccentricity of 0.25 and an inclination of 22° with respect to the ecliptic.

Naming 

This minor planet was named after Swiss astronomer Fritz Zwicky (1898–1974), who was a professor at Caltech and a pioneer in many fields, most notably in the study of galaxy clusters and supernovas, in high-energy astrophysics, and in developing jet propulsion for spacecraft and airplanes. He was the first to infer the existence of unseen matter and coined the term Dark matter. The lunar crater Zwicky is also named in his honour. The official  was published by the Minor Planet Center on 18 April 1977.

Physical characteristics 

Zwicky is a bright, stony S-type asteroid, in line with the overall spectral type for members of the Phocaea family.

Lightcurves 

In July 2018, a rotational lightcurve of Zwicky was obtained from photometric observations by the TESS-team which gave a rotation period of  hours and an amplitude of  magnitude. These more recent result are replacing a previous observation from March 2003, of a fragmentary lightcurve by French amateur astronomer Laurent Bernasconi that gave a tentative period of 27.1 hours and an amplitude of 0.08.

Diameter and albedo 

The Collaborative Asteroid Lightcurve Link assumes a standard albedo for Phocaea asteroids of 0.23, and calculates a diameter of 10.06 kilometers based on an absolute magnitude of 12.2.

Satellite 

Photometric observations at the Command Module Observatory  by Tom Polakis on 21 February 2021 revealed, that Zwicky has a satellite in its orbit. The moon has a diameter of approximately 2.50 kilometers, or 26% of that of its primary, and an orbital period of 28.46 hours.

References

External links 
 Minor Planet 1803 Zwicky -- Discovery of Binary Companion, Tom Polakis on YouTube
 Lightcurve Database (LCDB), query form (info)
 Dictionary of Minor Planet Names, Google books
 Asteroids and comets rotation curves, CdR – Geneva Observatory, Raoul Behrend
 Discovery Circumstances: Numbered Minor Planets (1)-(5000) – Minor Planet Center
 
 

001803
Discoveries by Paul Wild (Swiss astronomer)
Named minor planets
001803
19670206